24/7 is an American reality television program that follows sportsmen, and sporting organizations, for a period of weeks in the lead-up to a major sporting event.  The program premiered with episodes featuring pairs of boxers as they prepare for their upcoming boxing match against one another.  More recently it has expanded to other sport rivalries as well with NASCAR and the rivalry leading up to the 2011 NHL Winter Classic. Each edition of the program is generally split up into three to four episodes, and is narrated by Liev Schreiber.

In September 2019, the program was resumed airing under the title of  24/7 College Football, focused on four college football teams.

Episodes

NHL Hockey
 Washington Capitals vs. Pittsburgh Penguins (2011)
 New York Rangers vs. Philadelphia Flyers (2012)
 Toronto Maple Leafs vs. Detroit Red Wings (2014)

Boxing
 Oscar De La Hoya vs. Floyd Mayweather
 Floyd Mayweather vs. Ricky Hatton
 Joe Calzaghe vs. Roy Jones, Jr.
 Oscar De La Hoya vs. Manny Pacquiao
 Manny Pacquiao vs. Ricky Hatton
 Floyd Mayweather vs. Juan Manuel Marquez
 Manny Pacquiao vs. Miguel Cotto
 Floyd Mayweather Jr. vs. Shane Mosley
 Manny Pacquiao vs. Antonio Margarito
 Floyd Mayweather vs. Victor Ortiz
 Manny Pacquiao vs. Juan Manuel Marquez III
 Miguel Cotto vs. Antonio Margarito II
 Floyd Mayweather vs. Miguel Cotto
 Manny Pacquiao vs. Timothy Bradley
 Andre Ward vs. Chad Dawson
 Julio Cesar Chavez, Jr. vs. Sergio Martinez
 Manny Pacquiao vs. Juan Manuel Marquez IV
 Timothy Bradley vs. Juan Manuel Marquez
 Manny Pacquiao vs. Brandon Rios
 Manny Pacquiao vs. Timothy Bradley II
 Miguel Cotto vs. Sergio Martinez
 Bernard Hopkins vs. Sergey Kovalev
 Manny Pacquiao vs. Chris Algieri

NASCAR
 Jimmie Johnson: Race to Daytona

References

External links
HBO 24/7 Winter Classic site
NHL Winter Classic HBO 24/7 videos

2007 American television series debuts
2019 American television series endings
2000s American documentary television series
2010s American documentary television series
2000s American reality television series
2010s American reality television series
American sports television series
Boxing television series
English-language television shows
HBO original programming
HBO Sports
National Hockey League on television
NASCAR on television
TV series
2010–11 NHL season
2011–12 NHL season
2014–15 NHL season
Pittsburgh Penguins
Washington Capitals
New York Rangers
Philadelphia Flyers
Toronto Maple Leafs
Detroit Red Wings
2019 NCAA Division I FBS football season
Florida Gators football
Penn State Nittany Lions football
Arizona State Sun Devils football
Washington State Cougars football